Pine Hill is a mountain located in the Catskill Mountains of New York south-southwest of Unadilla. Sidney Mountain is located southwest and Poplar Hill is located northeast of Pine Hill.

References

Mountains of Delaware County, New York
Mountains of New York (state)